Comostola cedilla are a species of moth of the family Geometridae. It is found in New Guinea, Queensland, the southern Moluccas, Sulawesi, the Philippines, Borneo, Sumatra and Peninsular Malaysia.

External links
The Moths of Borneo
Insects of Australia

Hemitheini
Moths described in 1917